Sherif Fawaz Sharaf (born 1938) is a retired Jordanian administrator and Ambassador.

Career
From 1961 to 1962 he was employed at the Jordanian Ministry of Foreign Affairs.
From 1962 to 1963 he was employed at the Prime Minister's Office.
From 1963 to 1965 he was employed at the Jordanian Mission to the United Nations in New York.
From 1965 to 1966 he was employed at the Ministry of Foreign Affairs.
From 1966 to 1973 he was employed at the Youth Care Organization.
From 1974 to 1976 he was Director-General of Jordan Youth and Sports Organization.
From November 1976 to  he was Minister of Culture and Youth.
On  he was designated ambassador to Washington, D.C. where he was accredited form   till .
From  to 1990 he was Ambassador in Bonn (West Germany), Denmark, Sweden, Norway and Luxembourg and the European Economic Community.
From  to  he was Ambassador in Paris and the Holy See.

References

Books 

 Sahab el Nas Qablinah Tha Al Zaman", (2021) is a historical autobiography in the Arabic language, written by Sharif Fawaz. The book takes the reader through the tumultuous events that shaped the Middle East and Arab world, while introducing prominent international key players who impacted the region including the Hashemite Dynasty.

1938 births
Living people
Ambassadors of Jordan to the United States
Ambassadors of Jordan to Germany
Ambassadors of Jordan to France
Culture ministers of Jordan